Dawid Dawydzik (born 7 December 1994) is a Polish handball player for Wisła Płock and the Polish national team.

He represented Poland at the 2020 European Men's Handball Championship.

References

External links

1994 births
Living people
People from Legnica
Polish male handball players
Wisła Płock (handball) players